The 2008 Preakness Stakes was the 133rd running of the Preakness Stakes thoroughbred horse race. The race time was at 6:15 pm EDT and was televised in the United States on the NBC television network. Big Brown, the 1-5 favorite, was the winner by 5 lengths over Macho Again.  Approximate post time was 6:17 p.m. Eastern Time. The race was run over a fast track in a final time of 1:54.80.  The Maryland Jockey Club reported total attendance of 121,876, the second highest attended American thoroughbred racing event in 2008.

Payout 

The 133rd Preakness Stakes Payout Schedule

 $2 Exacta: (7-1) paid $36.60
 $2 Trifecta: (7-1-3) paid $336.80
 $1 Superfecta: (7-1-3-6) paid $1,192.30

The full chart 

 Winning Breeder: Monticule; (KY)
 Final Time:  1:54.86
 Track Condition:  Fast
 Total Attendance: 121,876

See also

 2008 Kentucky Derby
 2008 Belmont Stakes

References 

2008
Preakness Stakes
Horse races in Maryland
Preakness Stakes
2008 in sports in Maryland